Kapugama Priyantha (born 5 June 1968) is a Sri Lankan former cricketer. He played twenty-six first-class matches in Sri Lanka between 1988 and 1995. He was also part of Sri Lanka's squad for the 1988 Youth Cricket World Cup.

References

External links
 

1968 births
Living people
Sri Lankan cricketers
Burgher Recreation Club cricketers
Sri Lanka Air Force Sports Club cricketers
People from Matara, Sri Lanka